Derotettiginae is a subfamily of cicadas and includes two species Derotettix mendosensis  and Derotettix wagneri . It is restricted to the Dry Chaco and Monte de Llanuras y Mesettas ecoregions of Argentina. 

The subfamily characters include the head with eyes being wider than the width of the pronotum, a postclypeus that is rounded in transverse cross section. The mesonotum has no sound producing structures and the forewing has no pterostigma. The sole tribe Derotettigini within the subfamily is distinguished by the presence of a small prostrate primary femoral spine and no other spines. The male genitalia has the uncus not retractable within the pygofer. The aedeagus has a broad and flat theca. The forewing has seven apical cells.

References 

Cicadidae
Hemiptera tribes